The Committee on Education and the Workforce is a standing committee of the United States House of Representatives. There are 50 members of this committee. Since 2023, the chair of the Education and the Workforce committee is Virginia Foxx of North Carolina

History of the committee
Attempts were made to create a congressional committee on education and labor starting with the early congresses but issues over Congress's constitutional ability to oversee such issues delayed the committee's formation. Finally, on March 21, 1867, the Committee on Education and Labor was founded following the end of the Civil War and during the rapid industrialization of America. On December 19, 1883, the committee was divided into two, the Committee on Education and the Committee on Labor.  The committees again merged on January 2, 1947, after the passage of the Legislative Reorganization Act of 1946, becoming the Committee on Education and Labor again.  On January 4, 1995, when the Republicans took over the House, the committee was renamed the Committee on Economic and Educational Opportunities.  It was renamed again as the Committee on Education and the Workforce two years later on January 7, 1997. On January 4, 2007, with the Democrats once again in the majority, the committee's name was changed back to Committee on Education and Labor. After Republicans recaptured the House majority in the 2010 elections, they returned to the name, Committee on Education and the Workforce, effective with the opening of the 112th Congress in 2011. After Democrats recaptured the House majority in the 2018 elections, they similarly returned to the previous name, Committee on Education and Labor, effective with the opening of the 116th Congress in 2019. 
With the passing of the new House Rules associated to the Speaker negotiations in January of 2023, the 118th Congress renamed the committee as the Committee on Education and Workforce again.

Jurisdiction

From the Official Committee Webpage:

The Education and Labor Committee's purpose is to ensure that Americans' needs are addressed so that students and workers may move forward in a changing school system and a competitive global economy.

The committee and its five subcommittees oversee education and workforce programs that affect all Americans, from early learning through secondary education, from job training through retirement.

The Education and Labor Committee Democrats' goal is to keep America strong by increasing education opportunities for students, by making it easier to send young adults to college, and by helping workers find job training and retirement security for a better future. The following education issues are under the jurisdiction of the Education and Labor Committee:

Education. The Committee on Education and Labor oversees federal programs and initiatives dealing with education at all levels—from preschool through high school to higher education and continuing education. These include:

 Elementary and secondary education initiatives, including the No Child Left Behind Act, school choice for low-income families, special education (the Individuals with Disabilities Education Act), teacher quality & teacher training, scientifically based reading instruction, and vocational and technical education;
 Higher education programs (the Higher Education Act), to support college access for low and middle-income students and help families pay for college;
 Early childhood & preschool education programs including Head Start;
 School lunch and child nutrition programs;
 Financial oversight of the U.S. Department of Education;
 Programs and services for the care and treatment of at-risk youth, child abuse prevention, and child adoption;
 Educational research and improvement;
 Adult education; and
 Anti-poverty programs, including the Community Services Block Grant Act and the Low Income Home Energy Assistance Program (LIHEAP).

Labor. The Committee on Labor also holds jurisdiction over workforce initiatives aimed at strengthening health care, job training, and retirement security for workers. Workforce issues in the jurisdiction of the Education and the Labor Committee include:

 Pension and retirement security for U.S. workers;
 Access to quality health care for working families and other employee benefits;
 Job training, adult education, and workforce development initiatives, including those under the Workforce Investment Act (WIA), to help local communities train and retrain workers;
 Continuing the successful welfare reforms of 1996;
 Protecting the democratic rights of individual union members;
 Worker health and safety, including occupational safety and health;
 Providing greater choices and flexibility (including "comp time" or family time options) to working women and men;
 Equal employment opportunity and civil rights in employment;
 Wages and hours of labor, including the Fair Labor Standards Act;
 Workers' compensation, and family and medical leave;
 All matters dealing with relationships between employers and employees.

Members, 118th Congress

Resolutions electing members:  (Chair),  (Ranking Member),  (R),  (D)

Subcommittees

Historical membership rosters

115th Congress

Sources:  (Chair),  (Ranking Member),  (D),  (R),  (D),  (R)

116th Congress

Sources:  (Chair),  (Ranking Member),  (D),  (R),  (D),  (R),  (R),  (R)

Subcommittees

:

117th Congress

Resolutions electing members:  (Chair),  (Ranking Member),  (D),  (R),  (removing Rep. Greene),  (D),  (D),  (R),  (D),  (R),  (D)
Subcommittees

Chairs 

Committee on Education and Labor (1867–1883)

Committee on Education and Committee on Labor (1883–1947)

Committee on Education and Labor (1947–1995)

Committee on Economic and Educational Opportunities (1995–1997)

Committee on Education and the Workforce (1997–2007)

Committee on Education and Labor (2007-2011)

Committee on Education and the Workforce (2011-2019)

Committee on Education and Labor (2019–2023)

Committee on Education and the Workforce (2023-present)

See also 
Employee Free Choice Act
 List of current United States House of Representatives committees

References

External links
 Official homepage (Archive)
 House Education and the Workforce Committee. Legislation activity and reports, Congress.gov.

Education and the Workforce
Education in the United States
1867 establishments in the United States
Organizations established in 1867
Labor in the United States